Niederalteich (Central Bavarian: Niedaoida) is a village on the Danube in Bavaria, Germany. It is best known as the location of Niederaltaich Abbey.

References

Deggendorf (district)